The term post-disco is a referral to the early to late 1980s era movement of disco music into more stripped-down electronic funk influenced sounds; post-disco was also predecessor to house music.

This chronological list contains examples of artists, songs and albums described as post-disco, as well as its subgenre, boogie.

Songs

1970s

1980s

2000s and 2010s

Albums
Some examples of post-disco albums are listed here:

Artists
Musicians

A
Aurra

B
B. B. & Q. Band
David Bowie (Let's Dance period)
Sharon Brown

C
Change

D
D Train
The Deele

E
ESG

G
Gloria Gaynor (1980s)
Gwen Guthrie

H
Holy Ghost!

I
Imagination

J
Michael Jackson
Grace Jones

K
Kerrier District
Kid Creole and the Coconuts
Evelyn "Champagne" King (1980s)
Kleeer
Klein + M.B.O.
Kool & the Gang (1980s)

L
Lakeside
Liquid Liquid
Logg

M
Madonna
Metro Area
George Michael
Midnight Star

P
Peech Boys
Polyrock

R
Sharon Redd
Patrice Rushen

S
Shalamar
Shannon
The S.O.S. Band
Edmund Sylvers

U
Unlimited Touch

V
Vicky D

W
Was (Not Was)
Jody Watley
Wham!
The Whispers (1980s)

Producers, remixers and DJs

Arthur Baker
John "Jellybean" Benitez
Leroy Burgess
Patrick Cowley
Eumir Deodato

Quincy Jones
François Kevorkian
Frankie Knuckles
Larry Levan

Derrick May
Kelley Polar
Arthur Russell
Tee Scott

See also
List of dance-pop artists
List of dance-rock artists
List of funk musicians
List of house music artists

References

Bibliography

Post-disco
Post-disco
Post-disco